Ólafur Davíð Jóhannesson (born 30 June 1957, in Reykjavík) is an Icelandic football manager and former player who formerly managed the Iceland national team. During his manager career, he has won the Icelandic championship five times and the Icelandic Cup three times.

During his playing career, he played most of his years as a senior player with Haukar but started his career as manager only 24 years of age with the team Einherji from Vopnafjörður. He has managed Einherji, Skallagrímur, FH, Þróttur, Haukar, Selfoss, ÍR and Valur.

Managerial career

FH
Ólafur Jóhannesson managed FH a total of three times, the most recent and successful between the years 2002 and 2008.

During those years FH rose up to become a major power in Icelandic football. In his first season as manager, Ólafur steered his team to second place, FH highest finish in years.

Next season he did even better and made them champions and secured a place in the qualifying rounds of the Champions League. Ólafur won two more championships in the years 2005 and 2006 and winning the first VISA-cup in the history of FH in 2007.

Icelandic national team
Ólafur signed a two-year contract on 29 October 2007, after leaving his post as manager of Icelandic side FH. His first game in charge was against Denmark in November 2007. Ólafur has worked as a carpenter as well as being a manager for years.

Honours

Manager
FH
 Úrvalsdeild karla: 2004, 2005, 2006
 Icelandic Cup: 2007
 Icelandic League Cup: 2004, 2006, 2007, 2022
 Icelandic Super Cup: 2005, 2006, 2007

Valur
 Úrvalsdeild karla: 2017, 2018
 Icelandic Cup: 2015, 2016
 Icelandic League Cup: 2018
 Icelandic Super Cup: 2016, 2017, 2018

References

External links

1957 births
Living people
Olafur Johannesson
Association football defenders
Olafur Johannesson
Olafur Johannesson
Olafur Johannesson
Olafur Johannesson
Olafur Johannesson
Olafur Johannesson
Olafur Jóhannesson